Euseius erugatus is a species of mite in the family Phytoseiidae.

References

erugatus
Articles created by Qbugbot
Animals described in 1964